Isham is a village and civil parish in Northamptonshire, England.

Isham or ISHAM may also refer to:

 Isham (surname)
 Isham (given name)
 Isham baronets, a title in the Baronetage of England
 Isham, Saskatchewan, Canada, a community
 Isham, Tennessee, United States, an unincorporated community

 ISHAM, the International Society for Human and Animal Mycology